George Herbert Lamson Jr. (April 8, 1882 – December 4, 1931) was an American football and baseball coach and museum curator. He served as the head football coach at the University of Connecticut from 1906 to 1907, compiling a record of 4–9.  He was also the head baseball coach at Connecticut from 1906 to 1908, tallying a mark of 12–13–1.  Lamson was a star shortstop on the baseball team at Connecticut before graduating in 1902. Lamson was found dead on December 4, 1931, at the Taft Hotel in New York City.

Head coaching record

Football

References

External links
 

1882 births
1931 deaths
Baseball shortstops
UConn Huskies football coaches
UConn Huskies baseball coaches
UConn Huskies baseball players
People from Malden, Massachusetts